Colin Tatz AO (18 July 1934 – 19 November 2019) was the director of the Australian Institute for Holocaust and Genocide Studies, Professor of Politics at the University of New England, Armidale, and at Macquarie University, Sydney.

Biography 
Colin Tatz was born in South Africa on 18 July 1934. He was a graduate of the University of Natal and Australian National University. In 1964 Tatz received his Ph.D. from the Australian National University. He authored several books and published articles on race politics, genocide, the Holocaust, antisemitism, and racism in sport.

Bibliography 
Books
 Shadow and Substance in South Africa, A Study in Land and Franchise Policies Affecting Africans, 1910–1960 (1962).
 Aborigines in the Economy, edited by Ian Sharp and Colin Tatz (1966).
 Aborigines and Education, edited by S.S. Dunn and C.M. Tatz (1969).
 Black Viewpoints: The Aboriginal Experience, ed. C.M. Tatz (1975).
 Race Politics in Australia: Aborigines, Politics and Law (1979).
 Aborigines and Uranium and Other Essays (1982).
 Aborigines in Sport, Australian Society for Sports History (1987).
 The Royal Sydney Golf Club: The First Hundred Years, with Brian Stoddart (1993).
 Obstacle Race: Aborigines in Sport (1995) – Winner of the Australian Human Rights Award for Non-Fiction.
 Black Diamonds: The Aboriginal and Islander Sports Hall of Fame, with Paul Tatz (1996).
 Genocide Perspectives I, editor-in-chief (1997).
 AFL's Black Stars, with Michael Long (1998).
 One-Eyed: a View of Australian Sport, with Douglas Booth (2000).
 Black Gold: the Aboriginal and Islander Sports Hall of Fame, with Paul Tatz (2000).
 Aboriginal Suicide is Different: a Portrait of Life and Self-Destruction (2001).
 A Course of History: Monash Country Club, 1931 – 2001 (2002).
 Genocide Perspectives II: Essays in Holocaust and Genocide, eds. Colin Tatz, Peter Arnold and Sandra Tatz (2003).
 With Intent to Destroy: Reflecting on Genocide (2003).
 Genocide Perspectives III: Essays in Holocaust and Genocide, eds. Colin Tatz, Peter Arnold and Sandra Tatz (2006). 
 Worlds Apart: the Re-Migration of South African Jews, with Peter Arnold and Gillian Heller (2007).
 Genocide in Australia: By Accident or Design? (2011).
 Genocide Perspectives IV: Essays on Holocaust and Genocide, ed. Colin Tatz (2012).
 Human Rights and Human Wrongs: A Life Confronting Racism, Melbourne, Monash University Publishing, 2015, pp 382.
 The Magnitude of Genocide, with Winton Higgins, Santa Barbara, CA,  Praeger Security International, 2016, pp. 296.
 Australia’s Unthinkable Genocide, Bloomington, IN, Xlibris., 2017, pp. 272.
 Black Pearls: The Aboriginal and Islander Sports Hall of Fame, with Paul Tatz, Aboriginal Studies Press, 2018.
 The Sealed Box of Suicide: The Contexts of Self-Death, with Simon Tatz, Zug, Switzerland: Springer. 2019.

References

Sources 
 
 Prof. Tatz

Australian historians
South African emigrants to Australia
Australian Jews
Australian National University alumni
Officers of the Order of Australia
1934 births
2019 deaths